The Moment of Truth is a satire comedy drama play by Peter Ustinov written in 1951, telling the story of a Republic on the brink of defeat, while facing the threat of a political crisis with a crippled government structure.

Ustinov wrote the play inspired by French President Marshal Petain, his political relationship with Nazi Germany and the events surrounding the creation of Vichy France. The play was first premiered at the Adelphi Theatre, Adelphi in 1951. The play was revived in 2013 at the Southwark Playhouse in Newington Causeway, London by The New Actors Company. The production was directed by Rob Laycock, and opened on 26 June 2013 and closed on 20 July 2013 after 26 performances.

Plot summary 
Act One

The play opens with the anonymous Prime Minister, his Foreign Minister and General inside the cabinet office, their country on the verge of defeat as they wait for the Victor to arrive to accept their surrender. When the Victor arrives, instead of surrendering to him, they negotiate a deal to form a puppet government, where both the Prime Minister and Foreign Minister remain in power. To give legitimacy to this new government, the Prime Minister and his co-conspirators use a highly revered military hero, the retired Marshal, as the dictator of the country behind which they hide and use him as a puppet.

Act Two

Four years later, the General overthrows the Marshal and his puppet government, eventually liberating the Republic from foreign rule. Following a brief trial, the Marshal is sent to a remote prison. His daughter (The Girl), a Nurse and a Photographer stand by him.

Characters
 The Marshal An older, retired military hero who is mostly senile due to his mental condition. He often provides the comic relief in the story.
 The Prime Minister Also an older man, who has memory problems due to his advanced age. He uses the Marshal to keep himself in power.
 The General The head of the Republic's armed forces, he later overthrows the puppet dictatorship and liberates the country.
 The Girl Daughter of the Marshal. Unlike all the other characters, she is only one who is named. She has 13 different names including Beatrice and Cordelia.
 The Victor The leader of the enemy country hostile to the Republic. He later agrees to the Prime Minister's plan for a puppet government.
 The Photographer He captures the daily life moments of Marshal, which can be later used by the press whatever way they want.
 The Nurse She takes care of Marshal. She stands by him even during his imprisonment.
 The Foreign Minister The co-conspirator of the Prime Minister who helped form the plan to use the Marshal as their puppet dictator.

Revival
In June 2013, the play was revived by The New Actors Company and performed at the Southwark Playhouse in Newington Causeway, London.

Cast of 2013 Revival
 Rodney Bewes - The Marshal
 Miles Richardson - The Prime Minister
 Bonnie Wright - The Girl
 Callum Coates - The General
 Damian Quinn - The Victor
 Mark Carey - The Foreign Minister
 Toni Kanal - The Nurse
 Daniel Souter - The Photographer

Film adaptation
The play was adapted as a TV film for the Sunday Night Theatre, a long-running series of televised plays created by BBC and aired on 6 March 1955. Peter Ustinov himself played the role of The Marshal while rest of the characters were played by Peter Cushing as The Prime Minister, Jeanette Sterke as The Girl, Walter Rilla as The Victor, Donald Pleasence as The Foreign Minister, Hugh Griffith as The Photographer, Ian Colin as The General and Noel Hood as The Nurse.

References

External links 
 
 
 The Moment Of Truth-London Evening Standard Review
 The Moment Of Truth-The Stage Review
 The Moment Of Truth-British Theatre Guide
 The Moment of Truth, Southwark Playhouse, London – review
 Robert Tanitch reviews The Moment of Truth at Southwark Playhouse, London SE1

1951 plays
West End plays
Cold War fiction
Comedy plays
Plays by Peter Ustinov
British plays adapted into films
Cultural depictions of Philippe Pétain
Plays about World War II